McAnany is a surname. Notable people with the surname include:

Jim McAnany (1936–2015), American baseball player
Patrick McAnany (born 1943), Kansas Court of Appeals judge

See also
McAnaney
McEnany (surname)